Majid Molania (born 1980) is an Iranian traditional music composer. He is a winner of the Barbad Award for Best Iranian Music Composer of the Year for the album Shall Live in Love.

Works
 Dowran-e Eshgh
 Cheshm Bikhab
 Shall Live in Love

References

1980 births
Living people
Iranian composers

Barbad award winners